Brad Wilson may refer to:

 Brad Wilson (cricketer) (born 1985), New Zealand cricketer
 Brad Wilson (soccer) (born 1972), retired U.S. soccer midfielder 
 Brad Wilson (politician) of the Utah House of Representatives

See also
 Braden Wilson (born 1989), American football fullback
 Bradley Wilson (freestyle skier) (born 1992), American freestyle skier
 List of people with surname Wilson